Galeng Township (Mandarin: 尕楞藏族乡) is a township in Xunhua Salar Autonomous County, Haidong, Qinghai, China. In 2010, Galeng Township had a total population of 5,169: 2,599 males and 2,570 females: 1,315 aged under 14, 3,457 aged between 15 and 65 and 397 aged over 65.

References 

Township-level divisions of Qinghai
Haidong
Ethnic townships of the People's Republic of China